Erickson Le Zulu, stage name of Éric Bosiki (1978 – 16 February 2020) was an Ivorian disc jockey and singer.

Biography
Le Zulu began singing at age 9 at his church in the Democratic Republic of the Congo, while he began DJing in Ivory Coast. In 2006, Le Zulu won Male Performer of the Year at the RTI Music Awards in Ivory Coast.

Le Zulu was hospitalized as a result of Hepatitis B and cirrhosis of the liver, and died in Paris on 16 February 2020 at the age of 41.

Discography
Ouragan
Suzanna (2003)
Gloire (2007)
Nouvelle Génération
La main de Dieu

References

1978 births
2020 deaths
Ivorian musicians
Deaths from hepatitis
Deaths from cirrhosis